The Ministry of Environment was the department of the Government of Albania responsible for developing the government policy on prevention of pollution, protecting the natural heritage, biodiversity, forests, sea, water and energy.

From 15 September 2017, the department joined that of tourism forming Ministry of Tourism and Environment.

History

The Department of Environment was first established on 13 April 1992, in what is called the first Meksi I Government, where together with that department of Health they created the Ministry of Health and Environment. This came as a need for better management of natural resources, protection of forests, and better management of waste and natural pollution. Also with the establishment of the capitalist system in the country, the need for a special department that would give permissions for the use of natural and mineral resources became even greater until in 2001, while in the new Meta Government this department became a separate ministry and was considered one of the most important government ministries as it depended on functions directly related to the livelihood of the population. Such as environmental pollution, management of protected areas, forest management, air, water, and acoustic pollution, and many others. Today this department has joined the Department of Tourism by forming the Ministry of Tourism and Environment by linking two of the areas that according to Prime Minister Edi Rama are inseparable from each other in terms of objectives set by his government.

Reorganization
 Ministry of Health and Environment (1992–1998)
 Ministry of Environment (2001–2005)
 Ministry of Environment, Forests and Water Administration (2005–2009)
 Ministry of Environment (2013–2017)
 Ministry of Tourism and Environment (2017–present)

Officeholders (1992–present)

See also
 Environment of Albania

Sources

References

Environment
Ministries established in 1992
1992 establishments in Albania